KK Partizan history and statistics in FIBA Europe and Euroleague Basketball (company) competitions.

European competitions

Record

See also
 Yugoslav basketball clubs in European competitions

External links
FIBA Europe
EuroLeague
ULEB
EuroCup

References

 
Yugoslav basketball clubs in European and worldwide competitions